Paul H. Conner (June 6, 1925 – January 27, 2008) was an American military officer and politician who served as a member of the Washington State Senate, representing the 24th district from 1957 to 1959 and again from 1977 to 1993. A member of the Democratic Party, he previously served as a member of the Washington House of Representatives from 1959 to 1977.

References 

1925 births
2008 deaths
Democratic Party members of the Washington House of Representatives
Democratic Party Washington (state) state senators
People from Sequim, Washington
20th-century American politicians